Clare Elizabeth Kramer is an American actress best known for her recurring role as Glory in the fifth season of the television series Buffy the Vampire Slayer and for her role as Courtney in the film Bring It On. She has hosted the podcast Take Five with Clare Kramer.

Personal life
Kramer graduated from New York University with a bachelor's degree in psychology in addition to courses in theatre. She moved to Los Angeles in December 1999.

Kramer married producer Brian Keathley in October 29, 2005, with whom she has four children, daughters  Gavin and River Marie, and sons Hart and Sky Lynlee.

Career

Kramer appeared in several fifth season episodes of television's Buffy the Vampire Slayer. Her film roles include: The Thirst (as a vampire, this time a former drug-addict); The Skulls III (as a competitive swimmer who follows in her brother's footsteps by joining the title organization); Roger Avary's adaptation of the Bret Easton Ellis novel The Rules of Attraction; and Jessica Bendinger's cheerleading comedy Bring It On. The latter co-starred actress and real-life former cheerleader Kirsten Dunst, and fellow Buffy alumna Eliza Dushku.

Kramer has appeared in guest roles in theater and TV shows, including Tru Calling, which starred Eliza Dushku, and Sabrina, the Teenage Witch, in which she portrayed fictional movie star and shoplifter Babette Storm.

Kramer won the 2012 PollyGrind Underground Film Festival's Best Actress award for her portrayal of spree killer "Caitlin Shattuck" in the 2008 rock fantasy feature Road to Hell.

Filmography

Film

Television

Web

References

External links 

 Clare Kramer AMA about Buffy the Vampire Slayer and her career

Living people
Actresses from Georgia (U.S. state)
Actresses from Ohio
American film actresses
American stage actresses
American television actresses
American_people_of_British_descent
American_people_of_German_descent
Actresses from Atlanta
People from Delaware, Ohio
Tisch School of the Arts alumni
20th-century American actresses
21st-century American actresses
Year of birth missing (living people)